The 2004–2005 Sta. Lucia Realtors season was the 12th season of the franchise in the Philippine Basketball Association (PBA).

Draft picks

Roster

Philippine Cup

Game log

|- bgcolor="#edbebf"
| 1
| October 7
| San Miguel
| 73–79
| 
| 
| 
| Zamboanga City
| 0–1
|- bgcolor="#edbebf" 
| 2
| October 10
| Brgy.Ginebra
| 84–88
| Espino (22)
| 
| 
| Araneta Coliseum
| 0–2
|- bgcolor="#edbebf" 
| 3
| October 15
| Shell
| 78–84
| Duremdes (18) Espino (18)
| 
| 
| Philsports Arena
| 0–3
|- bgcolor="#edbebf" 
| 4
| October 22
| Purefoods
| 87–89
| Duremdes (37)
| 
| 
| Philsports Arena
| 0–4
|- bgcolor="#edbebf" 
| 5
| October 26
| Red Bull
| 118–124 (3OT)
| 
| 
| 
| Bacolod
| 0–5

|- bgcolor="#edbebf" 
| 6
| November 3
| Alaska
| 
| 
| 
| 
| Araneta Coliseum
| 0–6
|- bgcolor="#bbffbb" 
| 7
| November 7
| Coca Cola
| 86–69
| 
| 
| 
| Araneta Coliseum
| 1–6
|- bgcolor="#bbffbb"
| 8
| November 12
| FedEx
| 
| Mendoza (35)
| 
| 
| Cuneta Astrodome
| 2–6
|- bgcolor="#edbebf"
| 9
| November 16
| Brgy.Ginebra
| 79–85
| 
| 
| 
| Cavite City
| 2–7
|- bgcolor="#edbebf" 
| 10
| November 19
| San Miguel
| 74–95
| 
| 
| 
| 
| 2–8
|- bgcolor="#bbffbb" 
| 11
| November 24
| Coca Cola
| 98–92
| Duremdes (24)
| Espino (8)
| Espino (6)
| Araneta Coliseum
| 3–8
|- bgcolor="#bbffbb" 
| 12
| November 30
| Talk 'N Text
| 104–102 
| Duremdes (34) Aquino (29)
| 
| 
| Puerto Princesa
| 4–8

|- bgcolor="#edbebf"
| 13
| December 5
| Shell
| 83–84
| Aquino (23)
| 
| 
| Araneta Coliseum
| 4–9
|- bgcolor="#bbffbb" 
| 14
| December 10
| Purefoods
| 91–89
| 
| 
| 
| Araneta Coliseum
| 5–9
|- bgcolor="#edbebf"
| 15
| December 15
| FedEx
| 104–114
| 
| 
| 
| Araneta Coliseum
| 5–10
|- bgcolor="#edbebf" 
| 16
| December 19
| Talk 'N Text
| 83–102
| Espino (23)
| 
| 
| Makati Coliseum
| 5–11
|- bgcolor="#bbffbb" 
| 17
| December 22
| Red Bull
| 105–84 
| Duremdes (27)
| 
| 
| Philsports Arena
| 6–11

|- bgcolor="#edbebf"
| 18
| January 5
| Alaska
| 95–105
| Duremdes (29)
| 
| 
| Philsports Arena
| 6–12

Transactions

Additions

Subtractions

Recruited imports

GP – Games played

References

Sta. Lucia
Sta. Lucia Realtors seasons